Rock City is the debut studio album by the American rapper Royce da 5'9". The album was released on November 26, 2002.

Track listing
 The album was released in many versions. Most notable of them is Version 2.0
 This Track listing is for Version 2.0

Notes 
"Get'cha Paper", "We Live (Danger)", "D-Elite Part 2", "She's the One" and "What Would You Do" from his original album do not appear on Version 2.0.

Samples 
 "My Friend" samples "Let's Have Some Fun" by The Bar-Kays, "Cross My Heart" by Killah Priest
 "Nickel Nine Is..." samples "I'll Live My Love for You" by Millie Jackson
 "Boom" samples "Forever Is a Long, Long Time" by Marc Hannibal, "Anthology" by Kay-Gees, "You Know My Steez" by Gang Starr, "Afro Puffs" by The Lady of Rage
 "Who Am I" samples "Livin Inside Your Love" by Earl Klugh
 "Life" samples "Woman in Love" by Barbra Streisand
 "You Can't Touch Me" samples "Love and Happiness" by Al Green
 "King of Kings" samples "Distant Land" by Traci Lords

Chart positions

Album chart positions

Singles chart positions

References

2002 debut albums
Royce da 5'9" albums
E1 Music albums
Albums produced by the Neptunes
Albums produced by DJ Premier
Albums produced by Ayatollah